The 23rd National Geographic Bee was held in Washington, D.C. on May 25, 2011, sponsored by the National Geographic Society.

7th grader Tiné Valencic, from Colleyville, Texas won the competition, beating out 52 other competitors representing the 50 U.S. states, Pacific territories, and Department of Defense dependent schools.

References

2011 in Washington, D.C.
2011 in education
National Geographic Bee